1817 Katanga, provisional designation , is a stony Phocaea asteroid in from the inner regions of the asteroid belt, approximately 16 kilometers in diameter. It was discovered on 20 June 1939, by English-born South African astronomer Cyril Jackson at Johannesburg Observatory in South Africa. It is named for the Katanga Province.

Orbit and classification 

The S-type asteroid is a member of the Phocaea family, a smaller population of asteroids with similar orbital characteristics named after their largest member, 25 Phocaea. Katanga orbits the Sun in the inner main-belt at a distance of 1.9–2.8 AU once every 3 years and 8 months (1,334 days). Its orbit has an eccentricity of 0.19 and an inclination of 26° with respect to the ecliptic.  Katangas observation arc begins with its official discovery observation in 1939, as its first observation made at Heidelberg Observatory in 1928, remained unused.

Lightcurves 

In April 2008, a rotational lightcurve of Katanga was obtained from photometric observations by American astronomer Brian D. Warner at his Palmer Divide Observatory in Colorado. It gave a rotation period of 8.481 hours with a brightness variation of 0.30 magnitude. The quality of this result supersedes two periods previously obtained by astronomers Stefano Sposetti and Glenn Malcolm in May and June 2001, respectively.

Diameter and albedo 

According to the surveys carried out by the Infrared Astronomical Satellite IRAS, the Japanese Akari satellite, and NASA's Wide-field Infrared Survey Explorer with its subsequent NEOWISE mission, Katanga measures between 9.76 and 15.90 kilometers in diameter, and its surface has an albedo between 0.133 and 0.353. The Collaborative Asteroid Lightcurve Link derives an albedo of 0.242 and a diameter of 16.28 kilometers with an absolute magnitude of 11.1.

Naming 

This minor planet was named after the Katanga Province, a rich mining region in the Democratic Republic of the Congo in Central Africa. The approved naming citation was published by the Minor Planet Center on 1 February 1980.

References

External links 
 Lightcurve plot of 1817 Katanga, Palmer Divide Observatory, B. D. Warner (2008)
 Asteroid Lightcurve Database (LCDB), query form (info )
 Dictionary of Minor Planet Names, Google books
 Asteroids and comets rotation curves, CdR – Observatoire de Genève, Raoul Behrend
 Discovery Circumstances: Numbered Minor Planets (1)-(5000) – Minor Planet Center
 
 

001817
Discoveries by Cyril Jackson (astronomer)
Named minor planets
19390620